Mulholland Books (US) is an imprint of Little, Brown and Company, a division of the Hachette Book Group. It specializes in publishing mysteries, thrillers, and suspense novels.

History 
Little, Brown and Company announced the creation of Mulholland Books on June 15, 2010. Mulholland Books is named after Mulholland Drive, a winding stretch of road that follows the ridge line of the Hollywood Hills. The imprint launched in Spring 2011 with the publication of a book by Marcia Clark.

For a time writer and producer Derek Haas curated a series of short stories on the Mulholland Books website under the title "Popcorn Fiction".

Notable publications 
 Guilt by Association by Marcia Clark (2011)
 The House of Silk by Anthony Horowitz (2011)
 Say You're Sorry by Michael Robotham (2012)
 The Cuckoo's Calling by Robert Galbraith (2013)
 Murder as a Fine Art by David Morrell (2013)
 The Thicket by Joe Lansdale (2013)
 The Shining Girls by Lauren Beukes (2013)
 S. by J.J. Abrams and Doug Dorst (2013)
 Whiskey Tango Foxtrot by David Shafer (2014)
 Canary by Duane Swierczynski (2015)
 Paradise Sky By Joe R. Lansdale (2015)
 Crooked by Austin Grossman (2015)

External links 
 Mulholland Books website

References 

Book publishing companies based in New York (state)
Publishing companies based in New York City
American subsidiaries of foreign companies
Publishing companies established in 2010
2010 establishments in New York City
Lagardère Media